Theodor Kery (24 July 1918 – 9 May 2010) was an Austrian politician, who was the Governor of Burgenland (1966–1987).

References

1918 births
2010 deaths
Austrian politicians